Forsyth County Schools is a public school district in Forsyth County, Georgia, United States, based in Cumming. FCS serves over 51,000 students and is the largest employer in the county with over 8,000 full-time employees and substitutes. Out of 180 school districts, FCS is the seventh largest school system in Georgia.

History
The district was established in 1860 as one of the first free public school systems in Georgia.

Schools
There are 22 elementary, 11 middle and 8 high schools as of the 2021–2022 school year.

In Georgia, FCS has 10 National Blue Ribbon Schools, 12 Governor's Office of Student Achievement award-winning schools, is an Advanced Placement (AP) Honor Roll District, has the highest credit rating from Moody's and SP (1 of 17 in the U.S.) and the highest SAT score. Among Metro-Atlanta and large districts, FCS has the highest ACT score, highest CCRPI score, highest county graduation rate (94%) and the highest financial efficiency rating (5/5 stars).

FCS provides a variety of unique learning opportunities for students, including the opportunity to earn high school credit in middle school, AP credits and college dual enrollment courses in high school, the STEM Academy at Forsyth Central High School, and an International Baccalaureate program at South Forsyth High School. The district was the first in Georgia to make up inclement weather days with online learning.

Technology
FCS is internationally recognized for being a leader in instructional and operational technology. This includes 1:1 computing ratios and internal broadcasting systems in all schools, as well as each classroom being equipped with permanent interactive boards. All full-time teachers are provided notebook computers, email, and websites/social media tools. Parents are provided with online communication tools to monitor students' assignments and grades 24 hours a day. The district was among the first in the nation to utilize BYOT (Bring Your Own Technology), which allows students to bring their own technology to use in the classroom. All students and teachers use the online learning management system itslearning.

Administration

Board of Education
The Board of Education is the governing body of the school system. Members are elected by the public to represent one of five districts to which they will serve staggered four-year terms.

Members:
Tom Cleveland - District 3 
Darla Light - District 4 
Wes McCall - District 1 
Kristin Morrissey - District 2
Nancy Roche - District 5

Superintendent
Jeff Bearden joined Forsyth County Schools as superintendent in 2014.

References

External links

  Forsyth County Schools- Official site
 Cumming School historical marker

School districts in Georgia (U.S. state)
Education in Forsyth County, Georgia
School districts established in 1860
1860 establishments in Georgia (U.S. state)